According to Eastern Orthodox traditions, according to the Commentary on the Apocalypse of Andreas of Caesarea, it is believed that Saint Antipas was the Antipas referred to in the Book of , as the verse says: "I know thy works, and where thou dwellest, even where Satan's seat is: and thou holdest fast my name, and hast not denied my faith, even in those days wherein Antipas was my faithful martyr, who was slain among you, where Satan dwelleth." According to Christian tradition, John the Apostle ordained Antipas as bishop of Pergamon during the reign of the Roman emperor Nero. The traditional accounts go on to say Antipas was martyred during the reign of Nero (54-68) or Domitian, by burning in a brazen bull-shaped altar for casting out demons worshiped by the local population.

There is a tradition of oil ("manna of the saints") being secreted from the relics of Saint Antipas.

Saint Antipas is invoked for relief from toothache, and diseases of the teeth. On the calendars of Eastern Christianity, the feast day of Antipas is April 11.

References

External links

 Catholic Online
 Sant’ Antipa di Pergamo
 CatholicSaints.Info
 Byzantine hymn to St. Antipas in youtube.com

People from Pergamon
Saints from Roman Anatolia
Book of Revelation
92 deaths
Christian saints from the New Testament
Year of birth unknown
Exorcists